is a Japanese football player.

Career

Tokyo Verdy
On 18 December 2018 it was confirmed, that Sugajima would be leaving the club at the end of 2018, where his contract expired.

Club statistics
Updated to 10 December 2017.

References

External links

Profile at JEF United Chiba

1995 births
Living people
Association football people from Tokyo
Japanese footballers
J2 League players
Tokyo Verdy players
JEF United Chiba players
Association football forwards